The role of Australian women in World War I was focused mainly upon their involvement in the provision of nursing services. Australian women also played a significant role on the homefront, where they filled jobs made vacant by men joining the armed forces. Women also undertook fundraising and recruiting activities as well as organising comfort packages for soldiers serving overseas. Around the issue of conscription, women were involved in campaigning on both sides of the debate, while they were also equally involved in the New South Wales strike in 1917. Nevertheless, despite this involvement, women have never occupied a central position in the Australian version of the ANZAC myth, although since the 1970s their role has been examined in more detail as a result of the emergence of feminist historiography, and specialist histories such as the history of nursing.

Nursing 

One of the primary roles for Australian women during the war was nursing. The Australian Army Nursing Service (AANS) comprised more than 3000 nurses during the war, over 2,200 of whom served outside Australia.  21 AANS nurses died during their war service and a number shortly thereafter. Nurses were present on the Western Front, and in Greece, England, India, Egypt, and Italy. The AANS comprised trained nurses, trained masseuses, 14 ward assistants and 1 bacteriologist. They served not just in Australian military hospitals but also in British hospitals and in ships at sea.

Hundreds of other Australian trained nurses served overseas with organisations including: the British nursing services, Red Cross, St John Ambulance and the Australian Voluntary Hospital. Australia also sent a number of female VADs to work in military hospitals. An example of these groups is the 20 nurses and a masseuse who were recruited to work in French hospitals by the Australian Red Cross Society, they were dubbed the "Bluebirds" in reference to the colour of their uniforms. The Australian nurses had their roles changed mid-way through World War I. As the war went on, the facilities became better throughout. They were able to clean and sterilize utensils used to clean up wounds. Offer mental support and treatment. And finally offer strong medication.

Other volunteer work 

The following women's voluntary organisations were involved in support work:

 Australian Red Cross
 Women's Christian Temperance Union
 Australian Women's National League
 Voluntary Aid Detachment
 Australian Comforts Fund
 The Cheer-Up Society

Awards 

The following women received medals or other awards for their war work:
 Flora Reid – Dame Grand Cross of the Order of the British Empire (DBE) – inaugural recipient – for aiding convalescent soldiers
 Vera Deakin – Officer of the Order of the British Empire (OBE) – for establishing the Australian Wounded and Missing Inquiry Bureau
 Sister Clare Deacon, Sister Dorothy Cawood, Sister Alice Ross-King, Staff Nurse Mary Derrer – Military Medal – for bravery rescuing patients from a burning building
 Sister Pearl Corkhill – Military Medal
 Sister Rachel Pratt – Military Medal
 Sister Alicia Mary Kelly – Military Medal

Opposition 

A number of Australian women opposed the war, or certain aspects of it.  Australian pacifists and anti-conscription activists during this period included Bella Guerin and Doris Blackburn.

Notable Australian women involved in the war

References

External links
Frances, Rae: Women’s Mobilisation for War (Australia), in: 1914-1918-online. International Encyclopedia of the First World War.

Further reading
 Adam-Smith, Patsy. Australian Women At War, Penguin, Melbourne, 1996
 Barker, Marianne. Nightingales in the Mud, Allen & Unwin, Sydney, 1989
 Bassett, Jan. Guns and Brooches, Oxford Melbourne, 1992
 Beaumont, Joan, ed. Australia’s War 1914-18, Allen & Unwin, Sydney, 1995
 Beaumont, Joan. "Whatever happened to patriotic women, 1914–1918?." Australian Historical Studies 31.115 (2000): 273-286.
 Cochrane, Peter. Australians At War, (ABC Books, Melbourne, 2001).
 Coates, Donna. "Myrmidons to Insubordinates: Australian, New Zealand and Canadian Women’s Fictional Responses to the Great War." in P. Quinn and S. Trout, eds. The Literature of the Great War Reconsidered (Palgrave Macmillan UK, 2001. 113-142).
 De Vries, Susanna. Heroic Australian women in war: astonishing tales of bravery from Gallipolli to Kokoda. (HarperCollins, 2004. ). 
 Fallows, Carol. Love and War, (Bantam Books, Sydney, 2002).
 Kretzenbacher, Heinz L. "The forgotten German-Australian stories of Australian history: Lesbia Harford’s The Invaluable Mystery and the predicament of German-Australians in the First World War."  Australisches Jahrbuch für germanistische Literatur- und Kulturwissenschaft / Australian Yearbook of German Literary and Cultural Studies (2014)  7:45-77 online
 McKernan, Michael. The Australian People and the Great War (Nelson, Melbourne, 1980).
 Oppenheimer, Melanie. "‘The best PM for the empire in war'?": Lady Helen Munro Ferguson and the Australian Red Cross Society, 1914–1920." Australian Historical Studies 33.119 (2002): 108-134.
 Oppenheimer, Melanie. Australian Women and War (Department of Veterans’ Affairs, Canberra, 2008).
 Oppenheimer, Melanie. Oceans of Love. Narrelle - An Australian Nurse in World War I, ABC Books, Sydney, 2006
 Reid, Richard. Just Wanted To Be There, (Department of Veterans’ Affairs, Canberra, 1999).
 Scates, Bruce. "The unknown sock knitter: voluntary work, emotional labour, bereavement and the Great War." Labour History (2001): 29-49.